Sunrise International is a cross-border marketing and immersive media company with a specialization in the Chinese market and focus on higher education, VR/AR, and e-commerce industries. The company also operates an experimental education and extracurricular learning division based in China. It was founded in 2011 by Gavin Newton-Tanzer and David Weeks and was a member of the Columbia Startup Lab in 2014.

Sunrise International is the local organizer of the Augmented World Expo (AWE) Asia, an annual virtual and augmented reality industry event typically hosted in China.

As a media and marketing company, Sunrise International advocates for international brands to directly advertise on local Chinese media channels, citing issues surrounding the Great Firewall of China as a reason for why local users cannot access international social media platforms like Facebook, Twitter, Google, and Youtube. The organization is occasionally quoted by international news outlets on various issues relating to VR/AR in China, cross-border e-commerce in China, education technology, and issues surrounding international student mobility. Early on in the COVID-19 pandemic, the company spoke on a number of occasions about the impact of the pandemic on international student mobility. The company also co-hosts the Washington International Education Conference

Sunrise's education activities consist of running competitions and conferences for students in East Asia, with a particular focus on debate, business simulation, coding competitions, and other summer programs. Its debate events are run in partnership with the National High School Debate League of China, and Sunrise debate students often travel internationally to compete at debate competitions hosted at Stanford, Harvard, the University of Pennsylvania, and the Asia Society. Sunrise's debate league is the oldest and largest high school English-language debate league in China, with competitions often hosted in second and third tier cities in China. Its case analysis league is the China Youth Business League, run in partnership with the Harvard Undergraduate Economics Association and the Wharton China Business Society. Sunrise sponsors the international case analysis competition at the Wharton China Business Forum along with PricewaterhouseCoopers.

References 

Social enterprises
Business models
Types of business entity